The 2023 season will be Bahia's 93rd season in the club's history. Bahia will be compete in the Campeonato Baiano, Copa do Nordeste, Série A and Copa do Brasil.

Current squad

Statistics

Overall
{|class="wikitable"
|-
|Games played || 20 (11 Campeonato Baiano, 7 Copa do Nordeste, 2 Copa do Brasil, 0 Campeonato Brasileiro)
|-
|Games won || 11 (8 Campeonato Baiano, 1 Copa do Nordeste, 2 Copa do Brasil, 0 Campeonato Brasileiro)
|-
|Games drawn || 3 (0 Campeonato Baiano, 3 Copa do Nordeste, 0 Copa do Brasil, 0 Campeonato Brasileiro)
|-
|Games lost || 6 (3 Campeonato Baiano, 3 Copa do Nordeste, 0 Copa do Brasil, 0 Campeonato Brasileiro)
|-
|Goals scored || 27
|-
|Goals conceded || 27
|-
|Goal difference || 0
|-
|Best results  || 4–1 (A) v Jacuipense - Copa do Brasil - 2023.03.014–1 (H) v Itabuna - Campeonato Baiano - 2023.03.18
|-
|Worst result || 0–6 (A) v Sport - Copa do Nordeste - 2023.02.22
|-
|Top scorer || Everaldo (6)
|-

Goalscorers

Managers performance

Competitions

Overview

Campeonato Baiano

First stage

Semifinals

Finals

Copa do Nordeste

Group stage

Copa do Brasil

First round

Second round

Série A

League table

Results summary

Matches

References

External links

Esporte Clube Bahia seasons 
Bahia